Florence Maud Broadhurst (28 July 1899 – 15 October 1977) was an Australian painter and wallpaper and fabrics designer as well as a businesswoman. She was murdered in the Sydney suburb of Paddington, New South Wales and the perpetrator has not been apprehended.

Biography 
Broadhurst was born in Mount Perry, Queensland, at Mungy Station. She became a singer, winning local eisteddfods, and joined a group known as the Smart Set Diggers who performed in Toowoomba, Queensland. In 1922, she joined a comedy sextet known as the "Globe Trotters" and later the "Broadcasters", who toured South East Asia and China. In 1926, she established the Broadhurst Academy in Shanghai, offering tuition in violin, pianoforte, voice production, banjolele playing, modern ballroom dancing, classical dancing, musical culture and journalism.

After her return to Queensland in 1927, she sustained head injuries in a car accident. She then went to England and in 1929, married Percy Walter Gladstone Kann, an English stockbroker. They co-directed Pellier Ltd, Robes & Modes, and she called herself Madame Pellier. Kann and Broadhurst separated, and Broadhurst became involved with diesel engineer Leonard Lloyd-Lewis, living in Banstead from 1939. During World War II she joined the Australian Women's Voluntary Services, offering hospitality to Australian soldiers. In 1949, the couple and their son Robert moved to Australia, where she maintained the fiction that she was British. She travelled widely and produced 114 landscape paintings, which were first shown as "Paintings of Australia" in 1954 at David Jones Art Gallery, Sydney, then later in Brisbane and Canberra. In the late 1950s (or 1961) Lloyd-Lewis left her for a woman younger than their own son. 

She was a foundation member of the Art Gallery Society of New South Wales and a member of the Society of Interior Designers of Australia, was a teacher of printmaking and sculpture at the National Art School and was also involved in a variety of charitable activities. Broadhurst then ran a motor-sales company with her son.  She travelled to England in 1973, to receive cell therapy treatment for her failing eyesight and hearing.

Wallpapers 
In 1959 Broadhurst established Australian (Hand Printed) Wallpapers Pty Ltd., which later became Florence Broadhurst Wallpapers Pty Ltd, advertised as "the only studio of its kind in the world". She worked from a studio at 12-24 Roylston Street, Paddington. Her brightly coloured geometric and nature-inspired oversized designs were all hand printed. Technical advances made in her studio included printing onto metallic surfaces, the development of a washable, vinyl-coating finish and a drying rack system that allowed her wallpapers to be produced in large quantities. By 1972, her wallpapers reportedly contained around 800 designs in eighty different colours, while by the mid-1970s she monopolised the quality end of the Australian market and was exporting worldwide.

Broadhurst's library of wooden silk-printing screens and film positives was sold to Wilson Fabrics and Wallcoverings in 1978, just one year after her death. However, the decline of wallpaper as a popular form of home furnishing in the 1980s saw the collection languish, and it was later re-sold to Signature Prints Pty Ltd. Signature Prints in turn was purchased by a conglomerate led by current CEO David Lennie in 1989. Lennie had previously run a small wallpaper company in Auckland, New Zealand and briefly met Florence Broadhurst before her death.

In the late 1990s, Chee Soon & Fitzgerald, a tiny but influential Sydney design store, held the wholesale and retail distribution rights for Broadhurst wallpaper. This led to some popularity in Sydney design circles but little media attention. In the early 2000s, Signature Prints made a conscious decision to promote Broadhurst's designs overseas, specifically in the UK. This effort, coupled with an international resurgence of interest in wallpaper, greatly increased the designer's profile and led to distribution deals being struck for both the UK and the US in 2003. 

In 2017 the Florence Broadhurst archive was purchased by Signature Design Archive and Signature Prints no longer has any association with Florence Broadhurst or her designs. Over the years, some licences have been granted for use other than wallpaper, such as high-end fashion pieces by designers Akira Isogawa, Nicky Zimmermann and Karen Walker. In late 2008 a rug collection featuring ten Broadhurst designs was released in Australia and the US.
The French swimwear company Vilebrequin released a collection using a print by Florence Broadhurst for Father's Day 2019 titled "Rabbits and Poodles." They cite her designs as being the "perfect antidote to aging."

Death
Broadhurst was bludgeoned to death with a large piece of timber in her Paddington studio on 15 October 1977. The murder was never solved, but there has been some speculation that Broadhurst was a victim of English Australian serial killer John Wayne Glover, who was convicted of murdering six elderly women on the Sydney North Shore district between 1989 and 1990, and is thought by police to have been responsible for other deaths. In Gillian Armstrong's Unfolding Florence: The Many Lives of Florence Broadhurst, friends and employees of Broadhurst stated that they believed the killer may have been known to her and that the motive may have been financial. This was due to the presence of two cups of tea near her body, suggesting a meeting or appointment, and the killer's apparent knowledge of her factory's layout.

See also
List of Orientalist artists
List of unsolved murders
Orientalism

Further reading 
Gillian Armstrong, Unfolding Florence: The Many Lives of Florence Broadhurst, docu-drama, 2006
Helen O'Neill, Florence Broadhurst: Her Secret and Extraordinary Lives, 2006
Siobhan O'Brien, A Life By Design, 2004

References

External links 
Florence Broadhurst items at the Powerhouse Museum
Florence Broadhurst's Signature style
Florence Broadhurst Website

1899 births
1977 murders in Australia
1977 deaths
20th-century Australian painters
20th-century Australian women artists
Australian designers
Australian murder victims
Australian women painters
Female murder victims
Orientalist painters
People murdered in New South Wales
Unsolved murders in Australia
19th-century Australian women
1970s in New South Wales